Football Club Internazionale Milano is an Italian association football club based in Milan, Lombardy. The club was formed on 9 March 1908 to allow the foreign players to play in Italy. Inter played its first competitive match on 10 January 1909 against their cross-town rivals Milan, in which they lost 3–2. The club won its very first title in 1910 – the 1909–10 Italian Football Championship. Since then, the club has won further 18 league titles, along with seven Coppa Italia and six Supercoppa Italiana. They have also been crowned champions of Europe on three occasions by winning two European Cups back-to-back in 1964 and 1965 and then another in 2010. The club experienced the most successful period in their history from 2006 to 2010, in which it won five successive league titles, equaling the all-time record at that time, by adding three Italian Cups, three Italian Supercups, one UEFA Champions League and one FIFA Club World Cup. During the 2009–10, Inter become the first and only Italian team to win the Treble and the second team to win five trophies in a calendar year.

UEFA-organised seasonal competitions

European Cup / UEFA Champions League

European Cup Winners' Cup

UEFA Cup / UEFA Europa League

UEFA Super Cup

FIFA competitions

Intercontinental Cup and FIFA Club World Cup

FIFA-only recognized seasonal competitions

Inter-Cities Fairs Cup

Overall record 
Only official matches include UEFA Champions League (formerly European Cup), UEFA Europa League (formerly UEFA Cup), UEFA Super Cup, UEFA Cup Winners' Cup, Inter-Cities Fairs Cup, Intercontinental Cup, and FIFA Club World Cup matches.

As of 14 March 2023

By club 
As of 14 March 2023

Sources

By country 
As of 14 March 2023

Sources
Key

Notes

External links
Match statistics at Inter.it

Europe
Italian football clubs in international competitions